York Notes are a series of English literature study guides sold in the United Kingdom and in approximately 100 countries worldwide.

They are sold as revision material for GCSE and A-level exams particularly as literary guides to introduce students to sophisticated analysis and perspectives of the specific title. The guides for A-level are sold under the name York Notes AS/A2, the GCSE guides under the name York Notes for GCSE with each guide attributed to its relevant author. There is also a range of York Notes Companion titles aimed at undergraduate level study.

In recent years the brand has launched York Notes Plus – a series of enhanced digital editions incorporating interactive materials.

See also
 BookRags
 CliffsNotes
 Coles Notes
 Shmoop
 SparkNotes
 Video study guide

External links
York Notes

Study guides